Mount Cook Aerodrome  is an airport near Mount Cook Village, New Zealand. Regular commercial flights originally ceased in 2002, however from the 23rd of December 2012 to the 27th of January 2013, Air New Zealand subsidiary Mount Cook Airline operated thrice weekly services from Mount Cook to Christchurch and Queenstown Airport. Air New Zealand decided not to resume the services for the 2013/2014 summer due to a lack of demand.

See also

 List of airports in New Zealand
 List of airlines of New Zealand
 Transport in New Zealand

Sources
New Zealand AIP (PDF)
Air New Zealand
Timaru Herald article on 2013 closure of Mount Cook route
Air New Zealand press release on 2012/13 Mount Cook routes

Airports in New Zealand
Mackenzie District
Buildings and structures in Canterbury, New Zealand
Transport buildings and structures in Canterbury, New Zealand